Haran may refer to:

Places
 Haran, Azerbaijan
 Haran, Iran (disambiguation)
 Harran, an ancient city in Upper Mesopotamia
 Harran in the Bible (Hebrew: חָרָן, Ḥārān), a place in the Bible

People

Haran (Hebrew: הָרָן), the name of three different men mentioned in the Hebrew Bible

People (surname)
 Brady Haran (born 1976), Australian independent film-maker and video journalist
 Cyril Haran (1931–2014), Gaelic footballer and manager, priest, scholar and schoolteacher
 John Haran, Gaelic footballer
 K. Haran (Haran Kaveri, born 1989), composer of film scores and sound tracks in Malaysian Tamil cinema
 Mary Cleere Haran (1952–2011), American cabaret singer.
 Tadhg Haran (born 1991), Irish hurler
 Elizabeth Haran (born 1954), Australian-Zimbabwean writer

Other
 葉蘭 (haran), a Japanese name for Aspidistra elatior, a plant leaf used in bento boxes
 HaRaN, an acronym for the Talmudic scholar Nissim of Gerona

See also
 Harran (disambiguation)